E313 may refer to:
 European route E313
 NEC e313, a handheld 3G phone from NEC Corporation
 Ethyl gallate food additive E number